Boseoksa (보석사, 寶石寺) is a Korean Buddhist temple located Seokdong-ri, Nam-myeon, Geumsan-gun, Chungcheongnam-do. 
It was founded in 885 during the 11th year of King Heongang. 
During the Japanese colonial period, this temple was designated as one of the 31 head temples. The resulting pyramidal hierarchy was supposed to take control over the Korean Buddhism.

Notes

References
  EncyKor 

Buddhist temples in South Korea